Expeller pressing (also called oil pressing) is a mechanical method for extracting oil from raw materials. The raw materials are squeezed under high pressure in a single step. When used for the extraction of food oils, typical raw materials are nuts, seeds and algae, which are supplied to the press in a continuous feed. As the raw material is pressed, friction causes it to heat.

Overview
An expeller press is a screw-type machine that mainly presses oil seeds through a caged barrel-like cavity. Some other materials used with an expeller press include meat by-products, synthetic rubber and animal feeds. Raw materials enter one side of the press and waste products exit the other side. The machine uses friction and continuous pressure from the screw drive to move and compress the seed material. The oil seeps through small openings that do not allow seed fiber solids to pass. Afterward, the seeds are formed into a hardened press cake, which is removed from the machine. Some companies claim that they use a cooling apparatus to reduce this temperature to protect certain properties of the oils being extracted.

Efficiency
Expeller processing cannot remove every last trace of liquid (usually oil) from the raw material. A significant amount remains trapped inside the cake remaining after pressing.  In most small-scale rural situations this is of little importance, as the remaining cake after oil extraction finds uses in local dishes, in the manufacture of secondary products, or in animal feed. Some raw materials do not release oil by expelling, the most notable being rice bran. To remove oil from commodities that do not respond to expelling or to extract the final traces of oil after expelling, it is necessary to use solvent extraction.

Design

Continuous screw
The earliest expeller presses utilized a continuous screw design.  The compression screws were much like the screws of a screw conveyor—that is, the helicoid flighting started at one end and ended at the other.

Interrupted screw
Valerius Anderson invented the interrupted screw design and patented it in the year 1900. Anderson observed that in the continuous flighting arrangement of a compression screw, there are tendencies for slippery materials either to co-rotate with the screw or to pass through with minimal dewatering. He wrote that "brewers' slops, slaughterhouse refuse" and other "soft and mushy" materials dewater poorly in continuous screw presses.

His invention consisted of putting interruptions in the flighting of a compression screw. It was much like having a hanger bearing in a screw conveyor: there is no flighting on the shaft at that point, so material tends to stop moving and pile up. It is only after solids accumulate in the gap that the downstream flighting catches material. When this happens, material is forced along its way. The result is better dewatering and thus a more consistent press cake.

Resistor teeth
After the 1900 patent, a major improvement was made with the addition of resistor teeth. Fitted into the gaps where there is no flighting, these teeth increase the agitation within the press, further diminishing co-rotation tendencies.

Expanded applications
As the years passed, applications of the interrupted screw design expanded beyond slippery and slimy materials. This happened because competing continuous screw presses worked best only under conditions of constant feed, at constant consistency. If either the consistency or the flow rate diminished, squeezing would diminish until it was inadequate for proper moisture removal. At the same time, if the consistency increased, the press could jam. To counteract these tendencies it was necessary to build a heavy press, frequently with a costly variable speed drive.

In contrast, it was found that the interruptions in the flighting of the Anderson screw would provide cushion within the press. If consistency decreased, compression was still effective. A plug of sufficiently solid material had to build up at each interruption before solids could progress toward the discharge. This self-correcting performance prevents wet material from purging at the cake discharge. It is achieved without varying the speed of the screw.

The economic advantages of these characteristics led to interrupted screw presses being used to dewater fibrous materials that are neither slippery nor slimy. Examples would be alfalfa, corn husk, and, more recently, paper mill fibers.

See also
Algaculture oil extraction
Dewatering screw press
Oil mill

References

Oils
High lipid content microalgae
Liquid-solid separation